The Atocha station memorial is a memorial monument located at Atocha station in Madrid, Spain, that commemorates the 191 victims of the 11 March 2004 Madrid train bombings.  Furthermore, it also honors the special forces agent who died when seven suicide bombers blew themselves up on 3 April 2004 during a raid on an apartment used by the bombers.

Texts composed of hundreds of expressions of grief sent in the days after the attack from all over the world are printed on a clear colourless membrane that is inflated by air pressure, rising balloon-like inside a cylinder. That structure is composed of glass blocks and sits on a platform or terrace overhead. The light in the empty blue room below comes from this source alone. At night the cylinder is illuminated by lamps within its base and can be seen throughout the station neighborhood.

King Juan Carlos, Queen Sofia and Prime Minister José Luis Rodríguez Zapatero attended a ceremony at the site on the third anniversary of the bombings, 11 March 2007. Wreaths were laid at the foot of the tower and mourners observed three minutes of silence.

References

Buildings and structures in Arganzuela District, Madrid
Monuments and memorials in Madrid
2004 Madrid train bombings
Monuments and memorials to victims of terrorism